Egegik Airport  is a city-owned, public-use airport serving Egegik, a city in the Lake and Peninsula Borough of the U.S. state of Alaska. Scheduled passenger service is available at this airport.

As per Federal Aviation Administration records, the airport had 1,182 passenger boardings (enplanements) in calendar year 2008, 1,213 enplanements in 2009, and 1,305 in 2010. It is included in the National Plan of Integrated Airport Systems for 2011–2015, which categorized it as a general aviation airport (the commercial service category requires at least 2,500 enplanements per year).

Although most U.S. airports use the same three-letter location identifier for the FAA and IATA, this airport is assigned EII by the FAA and EGX by the IATA. The airport's ICAO identifier is PAII.

Facilities and aircraft 
Egegik Airport has two runways with gravel surfaces: 12/30 is 5,600 by 100 feet (1,707 x 30 m) and 3/21 is 1,500 by 75 feet (457 x 23 m). There are three aircraft based at this airport, all single-engine.

Airlines and destinations

Statistics

References

External links 
 FAA Alaska airport diagram (GIF)
 Topographic map from USGS The National Map
 

Airports in Lake and Peninsula Borough, Alaska